Juan Jané (born 31 May 1953) is a Spanish water polo player. He competed at the 1968 Summer Olympics and the 1972 Summer Olympics.

See also
 Spain men's Olympic water polo team records and statistics
 List of Olympic champions in men's water polo
 List of world champions in men's water polo

References

External links
 

1953 births
Living people
Water polo players from Barcelona
Spanish male water polo players
Olympic water polo players of Spain
Water polo players at the 1968 Summer Olympics
Water polo players at the 1972 Summer Olympics
Spanish water polo coaches
Spain men's national water polo team coaches
Water polo coaches at the 1996 Summer Olympics
Water polo coaches at the 2000 Summer Olympics
Water polo coaches at the 2004 Summer Olympics
China women's national water polo team coaches
Water polo coaches at the 2008 Summer Olympics
Water polo coaches at the 2012 Summer Olympics